Steambath is an American sitcom on Showtime that presented the afterlife as a steam bath. It was adapted from the Off-Broadway play by Bruce Jay Friedman and featured three cast members and the director from the 1973 PBS TV adaptation.

Series overview
This show presents the afterlife as a steam bath in which recently deceased souls continue to obsess about the same petty concerns that obsessed them in their lives. Ultimately, they are cast into another room offstage which is represented by a dark void by God, the steambath's Puerto Rican attendant. The characters who originated in the play are allowed to stay as various others pass through each week.

Production
Producer Joe Byrne caught the 1973 PBS television production and saw the potential for a weekly series, so he convinced an executive at Warner Bros. to option the rights. All three American TV networks loved it and were keen on keeping Jose Perez as God, but Byrne refused to tone down the material  so the project sat in limbo until 1983 when Warner Bros. commissioned author Dan Greenburg to create a script. Greenburg loosely adapted the play and added the character of Blanche to serve as a "romantic interest" for Morty, although their relationship was never explored by David Pollack and Elias Davis, who wrote the rest of the episodes. It was picked up by Network, which broadcast the show as a companion to their other new sitcom, Brothers.

In addition to Perez, Neil J. Schwartz & Patrick Spohn returned from the PBS adaptation as the flamboyant songsters simply known as The Young Men, and Burt Brinckerhoff directed three of the six episodes. Although created as a standard sitcom, the show was shot on a closed set and included a laugh track. As with the play and PBS special, profanity and nudity were included, but this caused concern at Showtime, which insisted on whittling some of it out.

Cast and characters
 Jose Perez as Morty - Also known as God and Morte, Morty is an eccentric Puerto Rican who finds comfort in the menial labor of being a steambath attendant. He frequently takes detours from custodial duties and speaks commands into his computer to both do good for and wreak havoc upon the lives of humans.
Robert Picardo as Rodney Tandy - A P.R. executive with a 6-year-old daughter who recently got divorced, Tandy was excited about beginning a new chapter of his life, only to discover it was cut short.
Al Ruscio as Davinci - A crotchety old cab driver with a penchant for speaking in sexual innuendo. 
Janis Ward as Meredith - A free-spirited young woman who lacks sexual hangups but has never had an orgasm, Meredith was electrocuted in her bathtub while attempting to adjust her TV.
Neil J. Schwartz & Patrick Spohn as The Two Young Men - Reprising their roles from the PBS production, these unnamed flamboyant gay characters make quips in unison and randomly break into a song-and-dance number (which Schwartz also choreographed) in every episode.
Rita Taggart as Blanche - Morty's assistant is an original character created for this series.
Allen Williams as Gottlieb - Morty's personal butler who caters to his every frivolous whim.

Episodes

References

External links
 

1984 American television series debuts
1984 American television series endings
1980s American sitcoms
Showtime (TV network) original programming
English-language television shows
1980s American LGBT-related comedy television series
American LGBT-related sitcoms